Procopius I (died 1788) was Greek Orthodox Patriarch of Jerusalem (1787 – November 3, 1788).

1788 deaths
18th-century Greek Orthodox Patriarchs of Jerusalem
Year of birth unknown